Rosie Fellner is an English-Irish actress and producer. She began her career on the cult TV show The Fast Show and received attention for her portrayal of Joei Harkness in the series The Alan Clarke Diaries. Her other work includes The Trip to Italy, and she is the co-founder of the production company Rosebud Pictures with her husband Adrian Vitoria.

Early life
Fellner was born in Galway, the daughter of English parents Ruth Fellner and Vaughan Fell. After her parents divorced, her mother took her and her siblings to France, then Portugal, and finally Spain. She learned to speak fluent Spanish and finished high school while growing up in Malaga. As a child, her love of Shakespeare led her to play Hermia in a mountaintop theatre in Spain. She played Hermia again in her first professional theatre job at the Theatre Royal, Plymouth. At age 15, she joined her older brothers, Seth and Mojo, on a tour of Europe with the Turbozone International Circus Company as an acrobat. After that, she was offered a place at The Hub Theatre School in Cornwall and then at The London and International School of Acting.

Career
Fellner's career began in earnest with her role on the TV movie, So-Called Friends (1997), in which she played the role of Glory Factor.  Some of Fellner's multiple roles on television include her appearance on the cult comedy TV show, The Fast Show (2000), which gave her the opportunity to play various roles with Paul Whitehouse, Charlie Higson, Simon Day, and the rest of the cast, My Hero (2002), The Line of Beauty (2006), The Eustace Bros (2003), Hollyoaks (2006), where she was directed by her now-husband Adrian Vitoria, Casualty (2007–2009), and The Trip To Italy (2014) as Lucy, among others. Fellner has also appeared in many films including the role of Claire in Two Days, Nine Lives (2001) Boogie Woogie (2009) with Heather Graham and Gillian Anderson, Little Deaths (2010–2011) as Maria Joy/Elizabeth Gordon, and The Trip to Italy with Steve Coogan and Rob Brydon, and Two Jacks (2012) opposite Jack Huston and Sienna Miller Sienna Miller, among others. After the success of The Trip To Italy, which premiered at the Sundance Film Festival, Fellner then made a second movie with Michael Winterbottom called The Face of An Angel (2014), about the Amanda Knox trial, which should be released in the US in 2015.

Notably, Fellner has appeared opposite of Sean Bean in Age of Heroes (2012) and in Two Jacks (2013) with Jack Huston and Sienna Miller. Coming up, Fellner will appear in the movie 'Bus 657' (2015 – currently in post production) with Jeffrey Dean Morgan, Robert De Niro, and Kate Bosworth.
 
Fellner has also appeared in multiple short films, including a modern-day adaptation of Hamlet, All Our Sins Remembered (1998) as Emily Brahinski, Incorporated (2010) as Clarice, and Hit Girls (2011) as Emma. Hit Girls was also her first film as a producer. 
 
Fellner is currently filming a feature film, A New York Story in New York City.

Personal life
Fellner is married to director Adrian Vitoria, with whom she co-founded the production company Rosebud Pictures. The two barely escaped the 2004 Sri Lanka tsunami, and she wrote about the experience in The Independent in 2005.

Fellner teamed up with the youth campaign Bite the Ballot, which has expanded into a national campaign with thousands of supporters promoting the engagement of youth in politics.

References

External links
 
 
 Alan Clark Diaries

Year of birth missing (living people)
Living people
English film actresses
English television actresses
English film producers